Ajmal Zaheer Ahmad is an American film director, writer and producer from Detroit, Michigan. He is also co-founder and current CEO of Detroit-based film production company Exxodus Pictures. His work as a film maker includes Perfect Mismatch, Jinn and My Soul To Keep.

Early life and career 
Ajmal was born to Pakistani parents in West Bloomfield, Michigan. He attended Detroit Country Day School in Southfield, Michigan and Art Center College of Design in Pasadena, California.

Ajmal began his career as a concept designer in California for film, television and commercials. He made his debut in 2000 by creating a commercial for Apple Computers called Apple Core. Ajmal then produced a short film Alliance in 2005 and a Bollywood film It's a Mismatch (now Perfect Mismatch) in 2009. He gained public recognition by his action-horror-thriller film Jinn, released in April 2014.
Ajmal has also appeared Television series Icon News in 2010 and film The Citizen in 2012.

Jinn 

The film Jinn was written and produced by Ajmal Zaheer Ahmad. He told in an interview that he was thinking of making ‘Jinn’ for more than 10 years. He also told that he was listening stories of Jinn since childhood and his mother used to say “If you don’t eat your veggies, the Jinn is going to come out of the woods and get you.”.

Filmography

Television

References

External links 
 

Living people
American people of Pakistani descent
Writers from Detroit
American male writers
American television directors
American Muslims
21st-century American writers
People from West Bloomfield, Michigan
Film directors from Michigan
Year of birth missing (living people)